Rukiye Sabiha Sultan ("charm" and "morning"; 19 March 1894 – 26 August 1971) was an Ottoman princess, the third and last daughter of Sultan Mehmed VI and his first wife Nazikeda Kadın. She was the first wife of Şehzade Ömer Faruk, son of Caliph Abdulmejid II and Şehsuvar Hanım.

Early life
Sabiha Sultan was born on 19 March 1894 in her father's palace in Ortaköy. Her father was Mehmed VI, son of Abdulmejid I and Gülistu Kadın. Her mother was Nazikeda Kadın, daughter of Hasan Marshan and Fatma Horecan Aredba and first wife of her father. She was the third and last daughter born to her father and mother. She had two sisters, Münire Fenire Sultan, six years elder than her, born and died in 1888, and Fatma Ulviye Sultan, two year elder than her. Her birth was difficult, so that later her mother could not have any more children. She had a younger half-brother, Şehzade Mehmed Ertuğrul, born in 1912 by the Second Consort Müveddet Kadın.

Refik Bey, the son of Mihrifelek Hanım, the second kalfa of Sultan Abdulmejid I was appointed teacher to Sabiha, and her elder sister Ulviye Sultan. The two had learned to play piano from Mlle Voçino.

Marriage

Suitors
When her father ascended the throne in 1918, Sabiha was still unmarried, but had several admirers. Those who knew her always said that she was not like the other women of the Ottoman family. "Sabiha Sultan was different", said the Turkish poet Yahya Kemal.

Her first suitor is thought to be Rauf Orbay, a relative of one of Sultan Abdul Hamid II's consorts, Sazkar Hanım. He was followed by Mahmud Kemal Pasha. Another was Fuad Bey of the Babanzade clan. Captain Safvet Arıkan, Lieutenant Suphi Bey from Damascus were other suitors, but none of them were accepted. Another suitor was Mehmed Ali Pasha, the nephew of Ahmed Muhtar Pasha.

Her betrothal to Ahmad Shah Qajar, the last ruling member of the Qajar dynasty and Mustafa Kemal Atatürk was forfeited in favor of her second cousin Şehzade Ömer Faruk thus missing her chance of becoming the first "First Lady" of the nascent Turkish Republic.

Wedding

Sabiha and Şehzade Ömer Faruk who was four years her junior, the son of Abdulmejid II, the last Caliph of the Ottoman Caliphate and Şehsuvar Hanım, were in love with each other. When Abdulmejid asked Sabiha's hand in marriage for his son, Mehmed flatly refused as there was no such thing as a marriage between cousins. Şehsuvar Hanım, the prince's mother called on Nazikeda, and succeeded in convincing her.

The marriage took place on 29 April 1920, in the pavilion of the sacred relics, Topkapı Palace. The marriage was performed by Şeyhülislam Hayrizade Ibrahim Efendi. Sabiha Sultan's deputy was  Başkatip Ali Fuad Bey, and Ömer Faruk's deputy was Ömer Yaver Pasha. The wedding reception took place four months later on 29 April 1920 at the Yıldız Palace.

In May 1920, ten days after their wedding, Sabiha and Faruk moved to the mansion of Rumelihisarı. In October of the same year, her father bought two houses for his daughters in Nişantaşı. The mansions were known as the Twin Palaces. He gave one house to Ulviye Sultan, and the other to Sabiha. Sabiha and Faruk decided to live in Nişantaşı during the winter and Rumelihisarı in the summer.

Issue and exile

The couple's eldest daughter, Neslişah Sultan was born on 2 February 1921 in the Nişantaşı Palace. She was followed two years later by Hanzade Sultan, born on 12 September 1923 in the Dolmabahçe Palace.

At the exile of the imperial family in March 1924, Sabiha and her two daughters left Turkey. On 11 March, she left her mansion in Rumelihisarı and took the Orient Express to join her husband and father-in-law in Switzerland. Later they moved to Nice, where her youngest daughter Necla Sultan was born on 14 September 1927.

In 1930, Şehzade Ibrahim Tevfik, now penniless, came to live in Nice in a small cottage in a village nearby with his family. He then moved in with his cousin Sabiha and Ömer Faruk, where he died in 1931.

Her mother also used to come for a stay at Nice with her. A large room used to be assigned to her, which she shared with Prince Ertuğrul, her stepson, whenever he came back from Grasse. In 1938, she moved to Alexandria with her mother and sister after her mother's grave illness there.

In 1940, she attended the wedding of her daughter, Neslişah Sultan and Prince Mohamed Abdel Moneim, son of Egypt's last khedive Abbas Hilmi II. Her two other daughters, Hanzade Sultan, and Necla Sultan also married Egyptian princes, Mehmed Ali Ibrahim in 1940, and Amr Ibrahim in 1943 respectively.

Divorce
Sabiha's husband, Ömer Faruk developed an increased interest in his cousin Mihrişah Sultan, the daughter of crown prince Şehzade Yusuf Izzeddin. It was also a public knowledge that things were not going well between Faruk and Sabiha.

In 1944, Mihrişah even sided with Faruk when the council chose Prince Ahmed Nihad as the head of the family. While Sabiha backed the council's decision and approved the choice of the leader. Her daughters also sided with her. Faruk accused Sabiha of turning their daughters against him. But he was already in love with Mihrişah and the issue of the council was just an excuse.

And so on 5 March 1948, after twenty eight years of marriage, Ömer Faruk divorced Sabiha, and married Mihrişah Sultan. However, their marriage didn't last, and a few years later, Mihrişah divorced. Later Faruk would tell his friends, "I divorced the most beautiful woman in the world to marry the ugliest one. Fate!".

Later years
Following her divorce, Sabiha Sultan left her home in Maadi on the other side of Cairo to be closer to her eldest daughter, Princess Neslişah. Taking a few things with her she moved to a small apartment in Heliopolis. She sent her furniture to her second daughter Princess Hanzade's house in Cairo, while she was living in Paris. But after the Egyptian revolution of 1952, all she owned there was confiscated with all the belongings of her daughter and son-in-law.

Later, Sabiha went to Paris for a while, to live with Princess Hanzade.  Sabiha also stayed with Neslişah at Montreux for sometime. Here she visited her cousin Sultanzade Sabahaddin Bey, son of Seniha Sultan. But as soon as the female members of the Ottoman family were allowed to return to Turkey in 1952 she moved to Istanbul. She rented a small flat in Kuyuku Bostan Street in the district of Nişantaşı, and the few things she still had in Egypt were sent to Istanbul.

Death
Sabiha Sultan died on 26 August 1971 at the age of seventy seven in her mansion in Çengelköy, Istanbul and was buried in Aşiyan Asri Cemetery.

Honours

 Order of the House of Osman
 Order of Medjidie, Jeweled
 Order of Charity,  1st Class

Issue

Ancestry

References

Sources

1894 births
1971 deaths
People from the Ottoman Empire of Abkhazian descent
19th-century Ottoman princesses
20th-century Ottoman princesses
Burials at Aşiyan Asri Cemetery